In statistics, simple linear regression is a linear regression model with a single explanatory variable. That is, it concerns two-dimensional sample points with one independent variable and one dependent variable (conventionally, the x and y coordinates in a Cartesian coordinate system) and finds a linear function (a non-vertical straight line) that, as accurately as possible, predicts the dependent variable values as a function of the independent variable.
The adjective simple refers to the fact that the outcome variable is related to a single predictor.

It is common to make the additional stipulation that the ordinary least squares (OLS) method should be used: the accuracy of each predicted value is measured by its squared residual (vertical distance between the point of the data set and the fitted line), and the goal is to make the sum of these squared deviations as small as possible. Other regression methods that can be used in place of ordinary least squares include least absolute deviations (minimizing the sum of absolute values of residuals) and the Theil–Sen estimator (which chooses a line whose slope is the median of the slopes determined by pairs of sample points).  Deming regression (total least squares) also finds a line that fits a set of two-dimensional sample points, but (unlike ordinary least squares, least absolute deviations, and median slope regression) it is not really an instance of simple linear regression, because it does not separate the coordinates into one dependent and one independent variable and could potentially return a vertical line as its fit.

The remainder of the article assumes an ordinary least squares regression.
The intercept of the fitted line is such that the line passes through the center of mass  of the data points.

Fitting the regression line
Consider the model function
 
which describes a line with slope  and -intercept . In general such a relationship may not hold exactly for the largely unobserved population of values of the independent and dependent variables; we call the unobserved deviations from the above equation the errors. Suppose we observe  data pairs and call them }.

 

In other words,  and  solve the following minimization problem:

 

 

Here we have introduced

 

yields

 

This shows that  is the slope of the regression line of the standardized data points (and that this line passes through the origin). Since  then we get that if x is some measurement and y is a followup measurement from the same item, then we expect that y (on average) will be closer to the mean measurement than it was to the original value of x. This phenomenon is known as regressions toward the mean.

Generalizing the  notation, we can write a horizontal bar over an expression to indicate the average value of that expression over the set of samples. For example:

This notation allows us a concise formula for :

The coefficient of determination ("R squared") is equal to  when the model is linear with a single independent variable. See sample correlation coefficient for additional details.

Intuition about the slope 

By multiplying all members of the summation in the numerator by :  (thereby not changing it):

 

We can see that the slope (tangent of angle) of the regression line is the weighted average of  that is the slope (tangent of angle) of the line that connects the i-th point to the average of all points, weighted by  because the further the point is the more "important" it is, since small errors in its position will affect the slope connecting it to the center point more.

Intuition about the intercept 

 

Given  with  the angle the line makes with the positive x axis, 
we have

Intuition about the correlation

This assumption is used when deriving the standard error of the slope and showing that it is unbiased.

In this framing, when  is not actually a random variable, what type of parameter does the empirical correlation  estimate? For example, if x had 10 values from the natural numbers: [1,2,3...,10], then we can imagine x to be a Discrete uniform distribution. Under this interpretation all  have the same expectation and some positive variance.

Simple linear regression without the intercept term (single regressor) 
For the model without the intercept term, the OLS estimator for  simplifies to

 

Substituting  in place of  gives the regression through :

 

where Cov and Var refer to the covariance and variance of the sample data (uncorrected for bias).

The last form above demonstrates how moving the line away from the center of mass of the data points affects the slope.

Numerical properties

Model-based properties
Description of the statistical properties of estimators from the simple linear regression estimates requires the use of a statistical model. The following is based on assuming the validity of a model under which the estimates are optimal. It is also possible to evaluate the properties under other assumptions, such as inhomogeneity, but this is discussed elsewhere.

Unbiasedness

To formalize this assertion we must define a framework in which these estimators are random variables. We consider the residuals  as random variables drawn independently from some distribution with mean zero. This is the definition of an unbiased estimator.

Confidence intervals
However, those formulas don't tell us how precise the estimates are, i.e., how much the estimators  and  vary from sample to sample for the specified sample size. Confidence intervals were devised to give a plausible set of values to the estimates one might have if one repeated the experiment a very large number of times.

The standard method of constructing confidence intervals for linear regression coefficients relies on the normality assumption, which is justified if either:

 the errors in the regression are normally distributed (the so-called classic regression assumption), or 
 the number of observations  is sufficiently large, in which case the estimator is approximately normally distributed.

The latter case is justified by the central limit theorem.

Normality assumption
Under the first assumption above, that of the normality of the error terms, the estimator of the slope coefficient will itself be normally distributed with mean  and variance  where  is the variance of the error terms (see Proofs involving ordinary least squares). This allows us to construct a -value

 

where

 

is the standard error of the estimator .

This -value has a Student's -distribution with  degrees of freedom. Using it we can construct a confidence interval for :

 

at confidence level , where  is the  quantile of the  distribution. For example, if  then the confidence level is 95%.

Similarly, the confidence interval for the intercept coefficient  is given by

 

at confidence level (1 − γ), where

 

For example, in the Okun's law regression shown here the point estimates are

 

The 95% confidence intervals for these estimates are

 

In order to represent this information graphically, in the form of the confidence bands around the regression line, one has to proceed carefully and account for the joint distribution of the estimators. It can be shown that at confidence level (1 − γ) the confidence band has hyperbolic form given by the equation

 

When the model assumed the intercept is fixed and equal to 0, the standard error of the slope turns into:

 

With:

Asymptotic assumption
The alternative second assumption states that when the number of points in the dataset is "large enough", the law of large numbers and the central limit theorem become applicable, and then the distribution of the estimators is approximately normal. Under this assumption all formulas derived in the previous section remain valid, with the only exception that the quantile t*n−2 of Student's t distribution is replaced with the quantile q* of the standard normal distribution. When  is large such a change does not alter the results appreciably.

Numerical example

This data set gives average masses for women as a function of their height in a sample of American women of age 30–39. Although the OLS article argues that it would be more appropriate to run a quadratic regression for this data, the simple linear regression model is applied here instead.

{|class="wikitable" style="text-align:right;"
|-
! style="text-align:left;" | Height (m), xi
| 1.47 || 1.50 || 1.52 || 1.55 || 1.57 || 1.60 || 1.63 || 1.65 || 1.68 || 1.70 || 1.73 || 1.75 || 1.78 || 1.80 || 1.83
|-
! style="text-align:left;" | Mass (kg), yi
| 52.21 || 53.12 || 54.48 || 55.84 || 57.20 || 58.57 || 59.93 || 61.29 || 63.11 || 64.47 || 66.28 || 68.10 || 69.92 || 72.19 || 74.46
|}

There are n = 15 points in this data set. Hand calculations would be started by finding the following five sums:

 

These quantities would be used to calculate the estimates of the regression coefficients, and their standard errors.

 

 

The product-moment correlation coefficient might also be calculated:

See also
 Design matrix#Simple linear regression
 Line fitting
 Linear trend estimation
 Linear segmented regression
 Proofs involving ordinary least squares—derivation of all formulas used in this article in general multidimensional case

References

External links
 Wolfram MathWorld's explanation of Least Squares Fitting, and how to calculate it
 Mathematics of simple regression (Robert Nau, Duke University)

zh-yue:簡單線性迴歸分析

Curve fitting
Regression analysis
Parametric statistics